Crambus lyonsellus is a moth in the family Crambidae. It was described by Frank Haimbach in 1915. It is found in North America, where it has been recorded from Maine, Maryland, Michigan, Minnesota, Ontario, Quebec and West Virginia.

References

Crambini
Moths described in 1915
Moths of North America